Georges Sibre (date of birth unknown; died 20 November 1941) was a popular French lyricist and librettist for opérettes in the 1920s.

Operettas 
 Mariska by Mario Cazes.
 Princesse Nazaline, created on 25 March 1921 at the Eden Théâtre d'Asnières (France).
 Le singe était roi, 24 June 1921 at la Scala (Brussels).

Melodies 
 La Folie verte, music by 
 Petit Turco, music by Francis Popy
 Nous nous plûmes, music by Harry Fragson, revived in concert by 
 Sur un air de vielle, music by J. Taillefer

External links 
 Aïe donc, Cupidon on Gallica
 Elle est partageuse on Gallica
 George Sibre on 

French lyricists
French opera librettists
Year of birth missing
1941 deaths